HD 93486, also known as HIP 52381, is a binary star located in the southern circumpolar constellation Chamaeleon near the border with Octans. Its variable star designation is RZ Chamaeleontis (RZ Cha). It has an apparent magnitude ranging from 8.2 to 9.1, which is below the limit for naked eye visibility. At its current distance, HD 93486's average brightness is diminished by 0.53 magnitudes due to interstellar dust. The system has a combined absolute magnitude of +1.72.

In 1964, HD 93486 was discovered to be an eclipsing binary by astronomer W. Strohmeier and colleagues.  Four years later, the system was found to be an Algol variable and was  given the variable star designation RZ Chamaeleontis in 1974. J. Andersen et al. (1975) calculated a circular orbit of 2.8321 days, which is also its variability period. During this time, RZ Cha drops from photographic magnitude 8.2 to 9.1 when the smaller component is eclipsed, and to 8.8 when the larger one is eclipsed.

Both components have a stellar classification of F5 IV-V, indicating that they are slightly evolved F-type stars with luminosity classes intermediate between a subgiant and a main-sequence star. The primary has 151% the mass of the Sun and 2.29 times the Sun's radius. The secondary has 140% the mass of the Sun and 2.21 times the radius of the Sun. The system is metal enriched with an iron abundance and is estimated to be 2 to 3 billion years old.

References

Further reading

F-type main-sequence stars
F-type subgiants
Algol variables
Eclipsing binaries
Chamaeleon (constellation)
Chamaeleontis, RZ
CD-81 00391
093486
052381